Ron James Meighan (born May 26, 1963) is a Canadian former professional ice hockey defenceman.

Biography
Meighan was born in Montreal, Quebec. As a youth, he played in the 1975 Quebec International Pee-Wee Hockey Tournament with a minor ice hockey team from Gloucester, Ontario.  He was awarded the Max Kaminsky Trophy as the most outstanding defenceman in the Ontario Hockey League, during the 1981–82 OHL season.

He was drafted in the first round, 13th overall, by the Minnesota North Stars in the 1981 NHL Entry Draft.  He played forty-eight games in the National Hockey League: seven with the North Stars in the 1981–82 season and forty-one more with the Pittsburgh Penguins in the 1982–83 season.

Career statistics

References

External links

1963 births
Living people
Anglophone Quebec people
Baltimore Skipjacks players
Canadian ice hockey defencemen
Ice hockey people from Montreal
Minnesota North Stars draft picks
National Hockey League first-round draft picks
Niagara Falls Flyers players
North Bay Centennials players
Pittsburgh Penguins players